Lopheliella rockallensis is a species of sea snail, a marine gastropod mollusc in the family Skeneidae.

Description
The species is described as having a cyrtoconoid outline, with a height of 2.7 mm, width 2.3 mm and an elevated convex spire with slightly inflated, regularly growing whorls, averaging 4.5 in number.

Distribution
Specimens were recovered from water at depths between 500 and 1500 metres in a small rectangle on the southeastern flank of the Rockall Bank in the North Atlantic Ocean.

References

External links

rockallensis
Molluscs of Europe
Gastropods described in 2008